KOZO (89.7 FM) is a radio station broadcasting a religious music format. Licensed to Branson, Missouri, United States. The station is currently owned by David Ingles Ministries Church, Inc.

Translators

References

External links

OZO